Eva Maria van Esch (born 12 May 1986 in Rossum) is a Dutch politician, currently serving as a Member of Parliament for the Party for the Animals (Partij voor de Dieren, PvdD). She was appointed on 9 October 2019, taking the seat of outgoing party leader Marianne Thieme. She previously served as the party's faction leader in the Utrecht City Council.

Political positions
Van Esch proposes that dogs should be allowed into hospitals to visit their owners’ deathbeds. They should also be permitted into funeral homes to say a last goodbye. She favours tighter regulations for wood-burning.

References

External links
 E.M. (Eva) van Esch, Parlement.com

1986 births
Living people
21st-century Dutch politicians
21st-century Dutch women politicians
Members of the House of Representatives (Netherlands)
Municipal councillors of Utrecht (city)
Party for the Animals politicians
People from Maasdriel
20th-century Dutch women